The Tree of Hippocrates is the plane tree (or platane, in Europe) under which, according to legend, Hippocrates of Kos (considered the father of medicine) taught his pupils the art of medicine. Paul of Tarsus purportedly taught here as well. The Platanus in Kos is an oriental plane (Platanus orientalis), with a crown diameter of about 12 metres, said to be the largest for a plane tree in Europe.

Hippocrates' tree resides on the Platía Platanou (or "Square of the Platane"), in front of the Castle of Knights and next to the Gazi Hassan Mosque (erected in 1776) in the centre of Kos town. The current tree is only about 500 years old, but may possibly be a descendant of the original tree which allegedly stood there 2400 years ago, in Hippocrates' time. The tree has become hollowed out over the years, and some branches are supported by metal scaffolding. Next to the tree is a white tap with engravings in the Arabic language, also built by the Turkish Governor Gazi Hassan.

Derivatives of the original tree
The Medical Association of Cos presented a gavel made from wood of the plane tree to the President of the Canadian Medical Association in 1954.

Seeds or cuttings from the tree have been spread all over the world. A cutting of the tree was presented as a gift from the island of Kos to the United States and the National Library of Medicine, and planted on December 14, 1961 on the grounds surrounding the library. Many medical colleges, libraries or institutions have, or claim to have, trees cut or seeded from the original tree in Kos.

Trees cut or seeded from the original tree can be found, among others:
North America:
 A cutting was planted on the campus of the University of Alabama at Birmingham to accompany a commissioned marble statue of Hippocrates. The 1971 installation was a gift from the Nakos Foundation to the University's medical center.
 The Canadian Medical Association obtained a cutting in 1969, which was planted in Walker County, Alabama in 1981. 
 at The Warren Alpert Medical School of Brown University, Providence, RI 
 at The Brody School of Medicine, East Carolina University
 at Mercer University School of Medicine
 at the University of Michigan Medical School
 at the University of South Alabama College of Medicine
at the University of Victoria
 at Yale University
 at the University of Florida J Hillis Miller Health Science Center, where College of Medicine students obtained cuttings in 1969 and which inspired the annual Hippocratic Award
 at the Francis A. Countway Library of Medicine, Harvard Medical School, Boston, Massachusetts
 at the West Virginia School of Medicine Library, Charleston, West Virginia
 at the Quillen College of Medicine, East Tennessee State University, Johnson City, Tennessee
 at MedStar Harbor Hospital, Baltimore, Maryland
 at New York Medical College / Westchester Medical Center, Valhalla, NY
 at the University of Texas Health Science Center at Houston Medical School 
 adjacent to the University of Utah School of Medicine, where it is planted at the southwest corner of the Spencer S. Eccles Health Sciences Library
South America:
 at the University of São Paulo, Brazil
 at the Londrina State University, Brazil
Europe:
 at the University of Glasgow, Department of Medical Genetics
 at Queen's University Belfast Medical School, Northern Ireland  
 at the University of Barcelona, Faculty of Medicine and Health Sciences 
Oceania:
 at University of Sydney's School of Rural Health in Dubbo, Australia.
at Burwood Hospital, in Christchurch, New Zealand
at Orange Health Services, Orange, Australia
at Hawke's Bay Hospital in Hastings, New Zealand

Asia:
 in front of the Medical Library, Kyushu University, Fukuoka City (Japan). Donated by Dr. Hiroshi Kambara in 1973.

Additional images

See also
 List of individual trees

References

External links
Tree of Hippocrates panorama 360 panorama view of the ancient Plane Tree in the Square of the Platane, Kos .

Individual trees in Greece
Kos
Tourist attractions in the South Aegean
Individual plane trees